The 2021-22 Fjordkraftligaen was the 83rd season of Norway's premier ice hockey league, Eliteserien, and the 2nd under the sponsorship name Fjordkraftligaen.

Participating teams

Team changes
After finishing first in the 2020-21 Norwegian First Division, Ringerike Panthers qualified for the Fjordkraftligaen, replacing Narvik IK who finished last in the 2020-21 Fjordkraftligaen.

Regular season

Standings

Statistics

Scoring leaders 

List shows the ten best skaters based on the number of points during the regular season. If two or more skaters are tied (i.e. same number of points, goals and played games), all of the tied skaters are shown. Updated as of 3 March 2022.

GP = Games played; G = Goals; A = Assists; Pts = Points; +/– = Plus/Minus; PIM = Penalty Minutes

Source: hockey.no

Leading goaltenders 
The top five goaltenders based on goals against average. Updated as of 3 March 2022.

Source: hockey.no

Playoffs 
After the regular season, the top eight teams will qualify for the playoffs. In the first and second rounds, the highest remaining seed will choose which of the two lowest remaining seeds to be matched against. In each round the higher-seeded team will be awarded home ice advantage. Each best-of-seven series will follow a 1–1–1–1–1–1–1 format: the higher-seeded team will play at home for games 1 and 3 (plus 5 and 7 if necessary), and the lower-seeded team at home for games 2, 4 and 6 (if necessary).

Bracket

Quarterfinals

Semifinals

Finals

Relegation round 
The bottom two teams of the regular season faced two top teams of the First Division in the relegation round.

Final rankings

References

External links 
  

2021-22
Nor
Fjordkraftligaen